Ammoniphilus resinae is a Gram-variable, endospore-forming and facultatively anaerobic bacteria from the genus of Ammoniphilus which has been isolated from aged resin from a tropical rainforest in Indonesia.

References

Paenibacillaceae
Bacteria described in 2016